The Swedish National Audit Office is the agency responsible for oversight of the state finances through financial and performance audits of state agencies, state-owned companies and the Government of Sweden. It serves directly under the Riksdag and is therefore independent of the Cabinet. All state agencies are required to submit copies of their annual accounts and reports to this office for review.

The mission of the Swedish National Audit Office is to examine the government's activities in order to contribute to the effective management of state administration. The agency is led by one Auditor General who is appointed for a seven-year term without the possibility of re-appointment. The Auditor General decide independently on aspects of the state government to be audited, how to do its investigations. The current Auditor General for the period 2017–2024 is Helena Lindberg.

History
Auditing responsibilities in regards to the finances of the Swedish Government first began in 1530 when King Gustav Vasa set up the Räntekammaren, soon to become the Kammarkollegiet under control of the Lord High Treasurer of Sweden. Under King John III, the annual Rikshufvudboken was published which contained a breakdown of all national finances of Sweden within that year.

On 15 December 2000, the Riksdag decided to merge both the Auditor General of the National Swedish Accounting and Audit Bureau and the Parliamentary (Riksdag) Auditors into the present-day Swedish National Audit Office, which took effect on 1 July 2003. The final Auditor General of the  Auditor General of the National [Swedish] Accounting and Audit Bureau, Inga-Britt Ahlenius, was against said merger, as she claimed in several statements to the media that the merger would limit the Swedish National Audit Office's ability to act independently from the government.

See also
 Office of the Auditor General of Norway (Riksrevisjonen) - the corresponding agency in Norway
 Rigsrevisionen - the corresponding agency in Denmark
 National Audit Office of Finland (fi: Valtiontalouden tarkastusvirasto; sv: Statens revisionsverk) - the corresponding agency in Finland

References
 Sveriges Riksdag (translated by Ray Bradfield), The Constitution of Sweden: The Fundamental Laws and the Riksdag Act. Sveriges Riksdag, Stockholm. 2012.

External links
 

Government of Sweden
Government audit
Government agencies established in 2003
2003 establishments in Sweden
Supreme audit institutions